is a former Japanese football player. She played for Japan national team.

Club career
Takeoka was born on 1 May 1971. She played for Nikko Securities Dream Ladies. The club won L.League championship for 3 years in a row (1996-1998). However, the club was disbanded in 1998 due to financial strain and she retired.

National team career
On 21 August 1994, Takeoka debuted for Japan national team against Austria. She was a member of Japan for 1995 World Cup. She also played at 1995 AFC Championship. She played 3 games and scored 3 goals for Japan until 1995.

National team statistics

References

External links
 

1971 births
Living people
Place of birth missing (living people)
Japanese women's footballers
Japan women's international footballers
Nadeshiko League players
Nikko Securities Dream Ladies players
1995 FIFA Women's World Cup players
Women's association football forwards
Asian Games medalists in football
Asian Games silver medalists for Japan
Footballers at the 1994 Asian Games
Medalists at the 1994 Asian Games